Men's Downhill World Cup 1977/1978

Final point standings

In Men's Downhill World Cup 1977/78 the best 5 results count. Four racers had a point deduction, which are given in brackets. For the very first time there was a shared win, when Josef Walcher and Sepp Ferstl tied in the second race at Kitzbühel. Franz Klammer won his fourth Downhill World Cup in a row - this record is still unbeaten.

References
 fis-ski.com

External links
 

World Cup
FIS Alpine Ski World Cup men's downhill discipline titles